The Shire of Westonia is a local government area in the eastern Wheatbelt region of Western Australia, about  east of Perth, the state capital. Its seat of government is the small town of Westonia.

Although the Shire of Westonia is located in the Wheatbelt region, it is at the eastern limit of land suitable for wheat growing.  The most important industries of Westonia today are wheat and sheep, but historically it was a gold mining area.

History

The Westonia Road District was established on 30 June 1916. On 1 July 1961, it became the Shire of Westonia under the Local Government Act 1960, which reformed all remaining road districts into shires.

In April 2012, residents of the Shire of Westonia rejected a proposed merger with the neighbouring larger Shire of Yilgarn, with 82 percent of voters opposing the merger.

Wards
The Shire initially had a ward system with two elected members representing the north, south, west and town wards (for a total of eight members). However, following the 2009 local government elections the Shire of Westonia's ward system was abolished and the number of elected members was dropped to six.

Towns and localities
The towns and localities of the Shire of Westonia with population and size figures based on the most recent Australian census:

Population

Heritage-listed places
As of 2023, 69 places are heritage-listed in the Shire of Westonia, of which two are on the State Register of Heritage Places, the Edna May Tavern in Westonia and the Goldfields Water Supply Scheme.

References

External links
 

 
Westonia